Edward R. Manning (January 2, 1944March 4, 2011) was an American professional basketball player and college and National Basketball Association (NBA) assistant coach. He was the father of former NBA player and college coach Danny Manning.

He played college basketball for the Jackson State University Tigers from 1963 to 1967 and scored 1,610 career points. He was a member of the Kappa Alpha Psi fraternity. Manning was inducted into the Jackson State University Sports Hall of Fame in 2003.

He was drafted in the eighth round (80th overall) of the 1967 NBA draft by the Baltimore Bullets. In four NBA seasons with the Bullets, Chicago Bulls and Portland Trail Blazers, Manning averaged 5.1 points and 4.5 rebounds per game. He then played five seasons in the ABA—three with the Carolina Cougars and one each with the New York Nets and Indiana Pacers—averaging 6.6 points and 4.5 rebounds per game. He later played for several professional European teams.

In 1983, he was hired as an assistant basketball coach at the University of Kansas under Larry Brown and was on the staff of the team that won the 1988 national championship. Manning followed Brown to San Antonio in 1988 to serve as an assistant coach for the Spurs, where Brown had been hired as the team's head coach.

Manning later served as a scout for the Spurs. He died from a heart condition at age 67 in Fort Worth, Texas.

References

External links
NBA stats at basketballreference.com

1943 births
2011 deaths
African-American basketball players
American men's basketball players
Baltimore Bullets (1963–1973) draft picks
Baltimore Bullets (1963–1973) players
Basketball coaches from Mississippi
Basketball players from Mississippi
Carolina Cougars players
Chicago Bulls players
Indiana Pacers players
Jackson State Tigers basketball players
Kansas Jayhawks men's basketball coaches
New York Nets players
People from Summit, Mississippi
Portland Trail Blazers expansion draft picks
Portland Trail Blazers players
San Antonio Spurs assistant coaches
Small forwards
20th-century African-American sportspeople
21st-century African-American people